Brozović is a Croatian surname. Etymologically it is derived from the surname Broz, by means of possessive suffix -ov and a patronymic-forming suffix -ić.

It is among the most common surnames in the Karlovac County of Croatia.

It is chiefly distributed in the cities of Ogulin, Karlovac and Crikvenica.

It may refer to:

 Dalibor Brozović (1927–2009), Croatian linguist and Slavist
 Ilija Brozović (born 1991), Croatian handball player
 Marcelo Brozović (born 1992), Croatian footballer
 Marina Brozović, Croatian-American astronomer, co-discoverer of Jupiter LI (a.k.a. S/2010 J 1), a moon of Jupiter
 Milica Brozovic (born 1983), Russian and Slovakian pair skater
 Miroslav Brozović (1917–2006), Bosnian Croat footballer

See also
 Broz

References

Croatian surnames
Slavic-language surnames
Patronymic surnames